Tekna (short for Teknisk-naturvitenskapelig forening) is a union for graduate technical and scientific professionals in Norway.

History and profile
It was established in 1874 under the name Den Norske Ingeniør- og Arkitektforening ('the Norwegian Engineer and Architect Association'). In 1912 it was reorganized as Den Norske Ingeniørforening ('the Norwegian Engineer Association'). It was again renamed to Norske Sivilingeniørers Forening ('Civil Engineers' Association of Norway') in 1973, and to Tekna in 2004.

It has 97,000 members as of 2022.  The headquarters are in Oslo. It publishes Teknisk Ukeblad together with NITO.

Tekna is a member of the Federation of Norwegian Professional Associations, Nording (the Scandinavian association of engineering organisations), and Nordic IN. Its president is Lise Lyngsnes Randeberg.

References

Trade unions in Norway
Organisations based in Oslo
Organizations established in 1874
1874 establishments in Norway